Indian Institute of Information Technology Raichur (abbreviated IIIT Raichur or IIITR ) is a public technical and research university located in Karnataka, India. The Institute is being set up with the financial contributions of Ministry of Education, Government Of India and Government of Karnataka.

History 
IIIT Raichur was established by the Ministry of Education, Government of India, in 2019 under Public-Private Partnership (PPP) Model. It was given the status of Institute of National Importance (INI) by the Government of India, under the Indian Institutes of Information Technology Laws (Amendment) Bill, 2020. The bill was passed by the Lok Sabha on 20 March 2020 and by the Rajya Sabha on 22 September 2020. IIIT Raichur began functioning on 26 July 2019 from a temporary campus at Indian Institute of Technology, Hyderabad(IIT Hyderabad), with Budaraju Srinivasa Murty as the mentor director and IIT Hyderabad as the mentor institute. Since December 2022, Prof. Harish Kumar Sardana has been serving as the founding director of the institute.

Campus 
IIIT Raichur is sharing the campus of Government Engineering College (GEC), Yaramarus Camp, Raichur, Karnataka. All the Academic and Curricular activities take place at GEC Campus, Raichur. The students are residing in the Hostels at GEC Campus, Raichur.

The State Government of Karnataka has handed over a land of 74 Acres for the construction of a Permanent Campus at Raichur. The institute has invited a tender for the Appointment of an Architect for a Comprehensive Architectural Design Package for the Development of a Master Plan, Academic Block, Administrative Block, Faculty & Staff Housing, Student Hostels, Sports Facilities, and Related Infrastructure for IIIT Raichur.

Academics

Academic programmes
IIIT Raichur offers B.Tech, B.Tech(Honors), and Ph.D program in Computer Science and Engineering. The current intake of B.Tech program is 60 students. It uses a Fractal Academic System, involving continuous evaluation of students.

References

Raichur
Universities and colleges in Raichur district
Engineering colleges in Karnataka
Educational institutions established in 2019
2019 establishments in Karnataka
Education in Raichur